The New Orleans Massacre of 1866 occurred on July 30, when a peaceful demonstration of mostly Black Freedmen was set upon by a mob of white rioters, many of whom had been soldiers of the recently defeated Confederate States of America, leading to a full-scale massacre.  The violence erupted outside the Mechanics Institute, site of a reconvened Louisiana Constitutional Convention. The Republican Party of Louisiana had called for the Convention, as they were angered by the legislature's enactment of the Black Codes and refusal to extend voting rights to Black men. White Democrats considered the reconvened convention to be illegal and were hostile towards Republican attempts to gain increased political power in the state. The massacre "stemmed from deeply rooted political, social, and economic causes," and took place in part because of the battle "between two opposing factions for power and office." According to the official report, a total of 38 were killed and 146 wounded, of whom 34 dead and 119 wounded were Black Freedmen. Unofficial estimates were higher. Gilles Vandal estimated 40 to 50 Black Americans were killed and more than 150 Black Americans wounded. Others have claimed nearly 200 were killed. In addition, three white convention attendees were killed, as was one white protester.

During much of the American Civil War, New Orleans had been occupied and under martial law imposed by the Union. On May 12, 1866, Mayor John T. Monroe, a Democrat who had ardently supported the Confederacy, was reinstated as acting mayor, the position he held before the war. Judge R. K. Howell was elected as chairman of the convention, with the goal of increasing participation by voters likely to vote for removal of the Black Codes.

The massacre expressed conflicts deeply rooted in the social structure of Louisiana. It was a continuation of the war: more than half of the whites were Confederate veterans and nearly half of the Black Americans were veterans of the Union army. The national reaction of outrage at the earlier Memphis riots of 1866 and the New Orleans Massacre helped the Radical Republicans win a majority in both houses of Congress in the 1866 midterm elections. The riots catalyzed support for the Fourteenth Amendment, extending suffrage and full citizenship to freedmen, and the Reconstruction Act, to establish military districts for the national government to oversee areas of the South and work to change their social arrangements.

Tension builds 

The State Constitutional Convention of 1864 authorized greater civil freedoms to Blacks within Louisiana yet provided no voting rights for any people of color. Free people of color, who were mixed-race, had been an important part of New Orleans for more than a century and were established as a separate class in the colonial period, before United States annexation of the territory in 1803. Many were educated and owned property and were seeking the vote. In addition, Republicans had the goals of extending the suffrage to freedmen and eliminating the Black Codes passed by the legislature. They reconvened the convention and succeeded in incorporating these goals.

White Democrats by and large considered the reconvened convention illegal, as they said that the voters, then limited to whites only, had accepted the constitution. In addition, they argued legal technicalities: the elected chairman Howell had left the original convention before its conclusion and was, therefore, not considered a member, the constitution was accepted by the people, and the radicals, only 25 of whom were present at the convention of 1864, did not make up a majority of the original convention.

On July 27, Black supporters of the convention, including approximately 200 war veterans, met at the steps of the Mechanics Institute. They were stirred by speeches of abolitionist activists, most notably Anthony Paul Dostie and former Governor of Louisiana Michael Hahn. The men proposed a parade to the Mechanics Institute on the day of the convention to show their support.

The massacre 
The convention met at noon on July 30, but a lack of a quorum caused postponement to 1:30. When the convention members left the building, they were met by the black marchers with their marching band. On the corner of Common and Dryades streets, across from the Mechanics Institute, a group of armed whites awaited the black marchers. This group was composed largely of Democrats who opposed abolition; most were ex-Confederates who wanted to disrupt the convention and the threat to white supremacy the increasing political and economic power of blacks in the state represented.

It is not known which group fired first, but within minutes, there was a battle in the streets. The black marchers were unprepared and many were unarmed; they rapidly dispersed, with many seeking refuge within the Mechanics Institute. The white mob brutally attacked blacks on the street and some entered the building:

Federal troops responded to suppress the riot and jailed many of the white insurgents. The governor declared the city under martial law until August 3.

Nearly 200 people were killed, almost all African Americans, including Victor Lacroix.

Reaction
The national reaction to the New Orleans riot, coupled with the earlier Memphis riots of 1866, was one of heightened concern about the current Reconstruction strategy and desire for a change of leadership. In the 1866 midterm elections, the Republican Party, increased their majority further, ultimately gaining 77% of the seats in Congress, enabling them to overturn any veto by Democratic President Andrew Johnson, who was opposed to granting equal rights to freedmen. In both houses of Congress, the faction known as the "Radical Republicans" prevailed, and imposed much harsher terms of Reconstruction on the states of the former Confederacy.

Early in 1867, the First Reconstruction Act was passed – over President Johnson’s veto – to provide for more federal control in the South. Military districts were created to govern the region until violence could be suppressed and a more democratic political system established. Under the act, Louisiana was assigned to the Fifth Military District. Ex-Confederate soldiers and leaders, most of whom were white supporters of the Democratic Party, were temporarily disenfranchised, and the right of suffrage was to be enforced for free people of color. Politicians associated with the riot were dismissed from office.

Benjamin Butler, an early advocate for the prospect of impeaching President Andrew Johnson, as early as October 1866 proposed alleged complicity in the massacre as one of several grounds for impeaching Johnson. After his election to the United States House of Representatives in the November 1866 House elections, Congressman-elect Butler continued to assert that, among several grounds for impeaching Johnson, was that Johnson allegedly, "unlawfully, corruptly, and wickedly confederating and conspiring with one John T. Monroe...and other evil disposed persons, traitors, and rebels," in relation to the massacre. Incidentally, in November 1867, when Thomas Williams authored the majority report of House Committee on the Judiciary at the conclusion of first impeachment inquiry against Andrew Johnson, the report recommending the impeachment of President Andrew Johnson outlined seventeen specific acts of alleged malfeasance by Johnson, the sixteenth of which alleged that Johnson had encouraged the massacre (which the report characterized as, "the murder of loyal citizens in New Orleans by a Confederate mob pretending to act as a police"). However, the United States House of Representatives voted 57–108 against impeaching Johnson on December 7, 1867. When Johnson was impeached months later, none of the articles of impeachment related to the New Orleans massacre.

See also
List of incidents of civil unrest in the United States

References
Notes

Bibliography

External links
 
 

Massacres in 1866
1866 riots
1866 in Louisiana
 July 1866 events
19th century in New Orleans
 Mass murder in 1866
1866 murders in the United States
 Racially motivated violence in the United States
 Riots and civil disorder in Louisiana
 White American riots in the United States
 Riots and civil disorder during the Reconstruction Era
 Crimes in New Orleans
 Racially motivated violence against African Americans
 Massacres in the United States
History of racism in Louisiana